The North Face of Fairview Dome also known as the Regular Route of Fairview Dome is a technical rock climbing route in Tuolumne Meadows of Yosemite National Park. It is featured in Fifty Classic Climbs of North America.

References

External links 
summitpost.org
mountainproject.com
rockclimbing.com

Climbing routes
Yosemite National Park